Wabash Township may refer to:

Illinois
 Wabash Township, Clark County, Illinois
 Wabash Precinct, Wabash County, Illinois

Indiana
 Wabash Township, Adams County, Indiana
 Wabash Township, Fountain County, Indiana
 Wabash Township, Gibson County, Indiana
 Wabash Township, Jay County, Indiana
 Wabash Township, Parke County, Indiana
 Wabash Township, Tippecanoe County, Indiana

Ohio
 Wabash Township, Darke County, Ohio

See also
Wabash (disambiguation)

Township name disambiguation pages